Francisco Vicente Jaumandreu, also known as Paco Jamandreu (October 17, 1925 – March 9, 1995) was an Argentine fashion designer and actor. He was a friend of Eva Perón and served as a costume designer on several Argentine films.

Career
Jamandreu made his debut as a movie costume designer in 1942, working for leading lady Zully Moreno in a movie named Historia de crímenes ("Crime Story"). He followed that by designing for El muerto falta a la cita ("The Dead One Missed the Appointment"), released in 1944, and in 1947's El misterioso Tío Silas ("The Mysterious Uncle Silas"). Jamandreu, who admitted his homosexuality to his father at age 15, became known among friend and clients not only for his talent, but also for his candor.

He began his friendship with Eva Duarte before she married populist leader Juan Perón in 1945. Their relationship was initially of a business nature, and Jamandreu began a long series of designs for the actress and, later, First Lady. He became her confidant, and vice versa. His friendship with Eva Perón was dramatized in Juan Carlos Desanzo's Eva Perón: The True Story (1996); he was portrayed by actor Horacio Roca. According to the film, Jamandreu admitted to Ms. Perón that he was homosexual, telling her that "being homosexual in Argentina is just like being poor."

Following a relative absence from Argentine cinema credits during the 1950s, Jamandreu became more active as film fashion designer during the 1960s, when he worked in six films. Between 1969 and 1995, he retired from designing clothes for film, but he debuted as an actor in 1980, participating in a movie named Una Viuda descocada ("A Crazy Widow"). In 1986, he acted in Soy paciente ("I'm Patient"), but that film was never released because the producers could not finish recording it.

In 1996, Jamandreu's last work as a film costume designer was displayed in Argentine theaters, when Amor de otoño was released. Jamandreu had been working in the Amor de otoño production when he died from a heart attack, on March 9, 1995.

References

External links
 
 

1925 births
1995 deaths
Argentine gay actors
Costume designers
Argentine male film actors
Argentine fashion designers
Argentine people of French descent
20th-century Argentine male actors
Argentine gay artists
LGBT fashion designers
20th-century Argentine LGBT people